Gaspoltshofen is a municipality in the district of Grieskirchen in the Austrian state of Upper Austria.

Geography
Gaspoltshofen lies in the Hausruckviertel. About 19 percent of the municipality is forest, and 71 percent is farmland.

References

Cities and towns in Grieskirchen District